The Free Voice: On Democracy, Culture And The Nation is non-fiction book written by Ramon Magsaysay Award-winning journalist Ravish Kumar on India's democracy and its backsliding under Prime Minister Narendra Modi.

Notes

References 

2018 non-fiction books
Cultural depictions of Narendra Modi
Speaking Tiger books